Dictyophragmus is a genus of flowering plants belonging to the family Brassicaceae.

Its native range is Peru to Argentina.

Species:

Dictyophragmus englerianus 
Dictyophragmus lactucoides 
Dictyophragmus punensis

References

Brassicaceae
Brassicaceae genera